"What Made the Red Man Red?" is a song from the 1953 Disney animated film Peter Pan with music by Sammy Fain and lyrics by Sammy Cahn, in which "the natives tell their story through stereotypical dance while singing". Some modern audiences consider it racist and offensive due to its exaggerated stereotypes. Although a similar depiction was displayed within J. M. Barrie's original play, later adaptations have reimagined the Natives, while the Disney version—and this song in particular—were said to have "doubled-down on racial stereotypes".

It has been compared to the song "Savages" from the 1995 Disney film Pocahontas, which contains negative lyrics regarding Native Americans; in contrast with "What Made the Red Man Red?", however, the offensive lyrics in "Savages" were written purposely, as they are sung by the villains of the movie, in order to illustrate the message that racism is wrong.

Production
Jonathan "Candy" Candido, who played the role of the Chief in Peter Pan, said the following in an interview with MousePlanet:

Context
Peter Pan and Wendy come across the Indians (who refer to themselves as "Injuns") during their travels in Neverland after rescuing the Chief's daughter, Tiger Lily. Wishing to learn more about them, the Lost Boys ask the Indians three questions: "What made the red man red?", "When did he first say 'Ugh'?" and "Why does he ask you 'How?'" (a corruption of the Lakota word "Hau", which translates to "Hello", etc.). This song is performed by "the big-nosed, guttural Chief character" accompanied by his tribesmen, who answer the questions. The Indians pass the peace pipe to the children (which John smokes, but becomes nauseated after) as they tell their tale.

Composition
Writer Kim McLarin of NPR describes it as a "bouncy, drum-heavy song", while the Best of Disney calls it a "labored routine".

Contemporary reception
Complex notes that in the 21st century, "you can't just ask people 'What Makes the Red Man Red?, and comments on the Lost Boys' musical number: "Jeez, you  little monsters, no wonder you're orphans." Althouse said the song has "obvious political correctness problems". AllDay notes that "the one time they break into song" is the only time the Native Americans do not speak in broken English throughout the film. In the article "Caught on Film: The Racist Ghosts of Disney's Past", DivineCaroline writes "The best part of the song is when the singers say that their version is the right one, 'no matter what's been written or said'." Bustle deems the song a "big ol' pile of racism". MediaDiversed says the "horror that was the song" serves to reinforce stereotypes and racist attitudes.

The Guardian writes that the song is "exactly as alarming to modern eyes and ears as its title suggests". Minnesota Playlist argues that this "infamous" number "upped the racist ante". RantLifestyle notes that "the chief ... is a walking stereotype", and sums up their view of the song by saying "Oh dear". David Martinez, author of American Indians and Film, writes, "My jaw hit the ground when I heard this song and saw these 'redskins' hopping around and making fools of themselves. Granted it was only a cartoon, but it was one in which the animators took the liberty of demeaning an entire race in the name of entertainment." The rapper Narcycist references the song in an article about the use of subtle racism in film. The Hollywood Reporter calls the song "infamous". Sasha Houston Brown, Santee Sioux tribe member and adviser to the American Indian Success Program at Minneapolis Community and Technical College, says about the scene: "I remember seeing it and not having the skills to understand why it made me feel embarrassed. What does that do to a child's formation of identity, even if it's subliminal and subconscious? The message is, 'You're not human. You're a trend. You're something that can be commodified and bought and sold. An opinion article at The Daily Revelle notes the problem of depicting Native Americans in this way: "Disney has always been there to teach proper morals ... from an early start, Americans are fed these ideas, and the topic is never properly taught to correct them ... If you're teaching American history, put the time and effort into respectfully educating others on the extraordinary people that were here first."

In an essay for Tor.com, American author and critic Mari Ness argues that the "cartoon war dance" and song go even further than Barrie's play by "stat[ing] that the Indians are not just savages, but sexist savages, who force Wendy to go fetch firewood while the other boys have fun." Wired says the "really awkward scene" features a "thoroughly appalling song, arguably more racist than anything in the notorious Song of the South". The blog Racial Stereotyping notes, "Not only does this video stereotype Native Americans but it also stereotypes women". Banon's Roar writes, "Watching now its [sic] cringe inducing. Every line is some kind of gag about how their skin is red and they make weird noises. Compare it even to the Crows from Dumbo. They were timely caricatures as well, but their jokes were not aimed at humiliating themselves." LeapToad says, "If any other ethnic group were treated this way, this film would have quietly disappeared, much like Song of the South has." Though Hollywood.com names the 1953 film version as the third best Peter Pan adaption, it recommends that viewers "forget that whole 'What Made the Red Man Red?' part, for obvious reasons". Greg Ehrbar of Mouse Tracks says the song "veers precariously into politically incorrect territory".

Marc Davis, one of the supervising animators of the 1953 film, said in an interview years after the production, "I'm not sure we would have done the Indians if we were making this movie now. And if we had we wouldn't do them the way we did back then...The Indians were Ward Kimball’s stuff. Beautifully done. The Indians could not have been done that way nowadays. I like them. Very funny. Very entertaining, especially the Big Chief." Disney historian Jim Korkis stated in attempt to clarify, "It is important to remember that Peter Pan was supposed to represent a young boy’s impression of pirates, mermaids and Indians and, as a result, these fanciful creations bore more of a relation to popular culture storybooks than reality."

Legacy
When the film has been syndicated on television, the native scene has often been removed.

Because of the perceived racial insensitivity of the characters and this song in particular by the time the film Return to Never Land was released in theatres in 2002, the Indians were not featured as characters in that movie. However, they appear physically in the tie-in videogame Peter Pan: Adventures in Never Land and in the Disney's Magic English series.

In Disney's Peter Pan, Jr. stage musical adaptation, the song is replaced by "What Makes the Brave Man Brave?", which focuses less on Native American stereotypes and more on what traits define a hero.

During production of the 2015 Warner Bros. live-action film Pan, the film's developers made a deliberate choice to distance the character of Tiger Lily and her people from Native American heritage and reimagine them as lacking any particular ethnicity, in order to "avoid the racial insensitivities of... Disney's 1953 animated film, which infamously featured the song 'What Made the Red Man Red?

The song is sampled in the Frank Waln song of the same title, in which he raps about the legacy of genocide and colonialism and criticizes the original song for its alleged racism.

References

External links
 Books.google.com.au

1953 songs
Peter Pan (franchise)
Disney songs
Native American-related controversies
History of racism in the cinema of the United States
Anti-indigenous racism in the United States
Songs about indigenous peoples
Film controversies
Race-related controversies in music
Race-related controversies in animation
Race-related controversies in film
Disney controversies
Ethnic humour
Songs with music by Sammy Fain
Songs with lyrics by Sammy Cahn